Yashwantrao Chavan: Bakhar Eka Vaadalaachi is an Indian Marathi language film directed by Jabbar Patel. The film stars Nana Patekar, Ashok Lokhande, Lubna Salim, Om Bhutkar and Vaishali Dabhade. Music is by Anand Modak. The film was released on 14 March 2014.

Synopsis 
Yashwantrao Chavan, born to a poor family in Karad, attempts to bring about a change by becoming the Chief Minister of Maharashtra and later a minister in the Central Government.

Cast 
 Nana Patekar
 Ashok Lokhande as Yashwantrao Chavan
 Om Bhutkar as young Yashwantrao Chavan
 Lubna Salim
 Vaishali Dabhade
 Meena Naik
 Rekha Kamat
 Bhargavi Chirmule Special appearance

Soundtrack

Critical response 
Yashwantrao Chavan: Bakhar Eka Vaadalaachi film received positive reviews from critics. A Reviewer of The Times of India gave the film 3.5 stars out of 5 and wrote "A tighter script would have been an added advantage but that apart, the film is very well researched and a must watch for those who want to get a sneak peak into India’s political history". Sunil Nandgaonkar of The Indian Express wrote "The films fares well on music, VFX, and other technical aspects. Though, it is definitely worth a watch, one could come away with the feeling of having sat through a good documentary rather than a feature film on YB Chavan’s life". A Reviewer of Divya Marathi says "This is a perfect piece of art that the youth must watch. Powerful screenplay, perfect direction, perfect acting and suitable music have all come together in the movie". A Reviewer of Loksatta wrote "Anand Modak has handled the important responsibility of music in this film, keeping in mind the importance of folk music, literature and social cause, the importance of folk arts in the formative period of Maharashtra". Soumitra Pote of Maharashtra Times gave the film 2 stars out of 5 and wrote "The failure of this film is that it is only at the level of 'documentary'. However, the film has become just a breeze while presenting the crest of the storm".

References

External links
 

2014 films
2010s Marathi-language films
Indian drama films